Melvin D. Close Jr. (born April 24, 1934) was an American politician who was a Democratic member of the Nevada General Assembly. An attorney, he is an alumnus of Brigham Young University and the UC Berkeley School of Law. He was Speaker of the General Assembly from 1967 to 1968, and President pro tempore of the Senate in 1977 and 1981.

References

1934 births
Living people
Nevada Democrats
People from the Las Vegas Valley
UC Berkeley School of Law alumni
Brigham Young University alumni